The 1993 Giro del Trentino was the 17th edition of the Tour of the Alps cycle race and was held on 11 May to 14 May 1993. The race started in Riva del Garda and finished in Arco di Trento. The race was won by Maurizio Fondriest.

General classification

References

1993
1993 in road cycling
1993 in Italian sport